Jorge Joaquim Messa Vulande, called Mavó (born 4 October 1971) is a retired Mozambican football midfielder.

References

1971 births
Living people
Mozambican footballers
Mozambique international footballers
Clube Ferroviário da Beira players
CD Costa do Sol players
GD Maputo players
CD Chingale players
UD Songo players
Association football midfielders